Shannon Griffith is a former American football coach.  He served as the head coach at Manchester University in North Manchester, Indiana, from 2004 to 2015. Color Commentary for 1380 The Fan High School Football Broadcast

Head coaching record

References

Living people
Ball State Cardinals football coaches
Ball State Cardinals football players
Manchester Spartans football coaches
Northwood Timberwolves football coaches
1967 births